The 2018 Women's Softball World Championship was an international softball competition held in Chiba, Japan, from 2 August to 12 August. It was the 16th edition of the tournament, and the third edition to be sanctioned by the World Baseball Softball Confederation (WBSC). Previous editions were sanctioned by the International Softball Federation, which governed the sport until its 2013 merger with the International Baseball Federation to create the WBSC. As the winners, the United States earned the right to compete at the 2020 Summer Olympics. It was the last world title awarded under the championship format before the WBSC implemented the new world cup 4 year cycle.

Qualification

Venues

Competition format 

The teams are separated into two groups of eight teams each for the preliminary round. Each group plays a single round robin. The top four teams in each group advance to the championship round, while the bottom four teams play in placement games. The championship round is played in a double Page round.

 Preliminary Page (two sections)
 Minor semifinals: Third- and fourth-place teams play (A3 vs. B4, B3 vs. A4). Winners advance to Preliminary Page final, losers eliminated.
 Major semifinals: First- and second-place teams play (A1 vs. B2, B1 vs. A2). Winners advance to Championship Page major semifinal, losers play in the Preliminary Page final.
 Finals: The minor semifinal winners and major semifinal losers play. Winners advance to the Championship Page minor semifinal, losers eliminated.
 Championship Page
 Minor semifinal: Winners of each Preliminary Page final play. Winner advances to Championship Page final, losers eliminated.
 Major semifinal: Winners of each Preliminary Page major semifinal play. Winner advances to Championship Page grand final, losers play in the Championship Page final.
 Final: The minor semifinal winners and major semifinal losers play. Winner advances to Championship Page grand final, loser finishes in third place.
 Grand final: The major semifinal winner and final winner play. Winner is the champion, loser is second place.

The games were played with the 15/10/7 run ahead mercy rule where a game was called if  one team leads the other by 15 runs or more after 3 innings, 10 runs or more after 4 innings, or 7 runs or more after 5 innings have been played.

Group stage

Group A

Standings

Games

Group B

Standings

Games

Placement round

13th-16th Placement

11th-12th Placement

9th place

Playoff round

Preliminary Page System

Preliminary Semifinals

Preliminary Finals

Championship Page System

Championship Semifinals

Bronze-medal game

World Championship Final

Final standings

External links
Official Website

References

Womens Softball World Championship
Women's Softball World Championship
Softball Womens World Championship
2018
Softball World Championship